Rodolfo Bruzzone (born 1901, date of death unknown) was an Argentine footballer. He played in four matches for the Argentina national football team in 1920 and 1921. He was also part of Argentina's squad for the 1920 South American Championship.

References

External links
 

1901 births
Year of death missing
Argentine footballers
Argentina international footballers
Place of birth missing
Association football defenders